Dolly Parton's Heartstrings, or simply Heartstrings,  is an American anthology dramedy streaming television series that premiered on November 22, 2019 on Netflix.

Premise
Dolly Parton's Heartstrings showcases "the stories, memories and inspirations behind Parton’s most beloved songs."

Production

Development
On June 4, 2018, it was announced that Netflix had given the production, then untitled, a series order for a first season consisting of eight episodes. Executive producers were expected to include Dolly Parton and Sam Haskell. Production companies involved with the series were slated to consist of Dixie Pixie Productions, Magnolia Hill Entertainment, Warner Bros. Television, and Sandollar Productions. The New York Times reported that the show was inspired by the WNYC podcast Dolly Parton's America.

In November 2018, it was reported that the series had been titled Dolly Parton's Heartstrings, that it would premiere in 2019, and that Patrick Sean Smith would serve as the series' showrunner and as an additional executive producer. Additionally, it was further reported that episodes would be based upon the songs "Jolene", "These Old Bones", and "If I Had Wings". All of the episodes were set to be written by Jim Strain with Joe Lazarov directing "These Old Bones" and Timothy Busfield directing "If I Had Wings". On December 19, 2018, it was announced that Terry McDonough would direct an episode based on the song "JJ Sneed" from another script by Strain. On February 11, 2019, it was announced that that other four episodes would be based upon the songs "Two Doors Down", "Down from Dover", "Sugar Hill", and "Cracker Jack". "Two Doors Down" was set to be directed by Wendey Stanzler from a script by Mark B. Perry, "Down From Dover" to be directed by Erica Dunton from a script by John Sacret Young, "Sugar Hill" to be directed by Lev L. Spiro from a script by Thomas Ian Griffith and Mary Page Keller, and "Cracker Jack" to be directed by Liesl Tommy from a script by Lisa Melamed.

Casting
Alongside the series order announcement, it was confirmed that Dolly Parton would appear in the series. In November 2018, it was announced that Julianne Hough, Kimberly Williams-Paisley, and Dallas Roberts had been cast in the episode "Jolene", that Kathleen Turner, Ginnifer Goodwin, and Kyle Bornheimer had been cast in the episode "These Old Bones", and that Gerald McRaney, Brooke Elliott, Ben Lawson, Michele Weaver, Delta Burke, and Tim Reid had been cast in the episode "If I Had Wings". On December 19, 2018, it was reported that Colin O'Donoghue, Willa Fitzgerald, David Denman, Mac Davis, and Vanessa Rubio had been cast in the episode "JJ Sneed". On February 11, 2019, it was announced that Melissa Leo, Ray McKinnon, Andy Mientus, Katie Stevens, and Michael Willett had been cast in the episode "Two Doors Down", Holly Taylor, Shane McGhie, Robert Taylor, Bellamy Young, Camryn Manheim, and Mary Lane Haskell had been cast in the episode "Down From Dover", Patricia Wettig, Timothy Busfield, Virginia Gardner, and Tom Brittney had been cast in the episode "Sugar Hill", and that Sarah Shahi, Rochelle Aytes, Jessica Collins, and Tammy Lynn Michaels had been cast in the episode "Cracker Jack".

Filming
Principal photography for the series commenced in September 2018 in Georgia. Filming occurred in locations that month such as Cartersville, Stone Mountain, Kennesaw, and at Third Rail Studios in Doraville. In October 2018, filming took place in such locations as Milton, Canton, the Orange United Methodist Church in Lathemtown, and Emory Hospital in Smyrna. In November 2018, shooting moved to locales including Norcross, Gainesville, Cumming. In December 2018, the production was working out of Snellville, Loganville, and downtown Canton. In January 2019, shooting was held in various areas like the Tucker Recreation Center in Tucker, Georgia and Marietta Square in Marietta, Georgia.

Episodes

Reception
On Rotten Tomatoes, the series holds an approval rating of 50% based on critic reviews, with an average rating of 5.94/10. On Metacritic, it has a weighted average score of 72 out of 100 based on reviews from 4 critics, indicating "generally favorable reviews".

The episode "Two Doors Down" received a GLAAD Media Award for Outstanding Individual Episode at the 31st GLAAD Awards. The episode "These Old Bones" was nominated for a 2020 Primetime Emmy Award for Outstanding Television Movie.

References

External links
 
 

2010s American drama television series
2019 American television series debuts
2010s American anthology television series
Dolly Parton
English-language Netflix original programming
Television series by Warner Bros. Television Studios